The 1938 St. Mary's Rattlers football team was an American football team that represented St. Mary's University, located in San Antonio, Texas, as a member of the Alamo Conference during 1938 college football season. Led by Frank Bridges in his fourth season as head coach, the team compiled a record of 6–9 overall with a mark of 0–2 in conference play, placing last out of three teams.

Schedule

References

St. Mary's
St. Mary's Rattlers football seasons
St. Mary's football